Yang Chuan-kwang, or C.K. Yang (Amis: Maysang Kalimud, ; July 10, 1933 – January 27, 2007), was an Olympic decathlete from Taiwan. Yang attended college at UCLA, where he trained and competed with teammate and Olympian Rafer Johnson and was coached by Elvin C. Drake.

Biography
Known as the "Iron Man of Asia," Yang won the decathlon event at the 1954 and 1958 Asian Games, as well as silver medals in the 110 m hurdles and long jump and the bronze medal in the 400 m hurdles. At the 1956 Summer Olympics he placed eighth in the decathlon.  He also competed in the high jump.

Yang's most memorable decathlon competition was a decathlon duel with Rafer Johnson, his friend and teammate at the University of California at Los Angeles, during the 1960 Summer Olympics in Rome. The lead swung back and forth between them. Finally, after nine events, Johnson led Yang by a small margin, but Yang was known to be better in the final event, the 1500m. According to The Telegraph (UK), "legend has it" that Drake gave coaching to both men, with him advising Johnson to stay close to Yang and be ready for "a hellish sprint" at the end, and advising Yang to put as much distance between himself and Johnson before the final sprint as possible. Johnson ran his personal best at 4:49.7 and finished just 1.2 sec slower than Yang, winning the gold by 58 points with an Olympic record total of 8,392 points. Both athletes were exhausted and drained and came to a stop a few paces past the finish line leaning against each other for support. Yang was the first Olympic medallist in his country's history.

His record only lasted a week. Later that year he finally took the decathlon world record from Johnson at the Mt. SAC Relays, coached by William Neufeld. He was the first man to break the 9,000 barrier under the old scale. When the new tables were re-evaluated, this same score was the first to break 8,000 points under the new system. To date, he is the only athlete not from the United States or Europe to hold the decathlon world record.

Yang placed fifth in the decathlon at the 1964 Summer Olympics.

He appeared in a number of films, including Walk, Don't Run (1966), as well as the 1970 western There Was a Crooked Man... as a tough inmate named Ah-Ping who did not speak.

Yang served in the Legislative Yuan from 1983 to 1986 as a member of the Kuomintang representing what became the Lowland Aborigine Constituency. He later spoke in support of the Democratic Progressive Party. 

After Yang's retirement from athletics, he worked as a trainer and supervisor at the National Sports Training Center in Zuoying, where Ku Chin-shui and Lee Fu-an were trained. After that, Yang converted to Taoism from Christianity, and served as a Taoist priest and a Tangki in a Taoist temple in his native place for 20 years.

Yang was a member of the Amis, one of the sixteen officially recognized peoples of Taiwanese aborigines. He had a wife, Daisy, and two sons: Cedric Yang (Yang Sui-yuen) and C.K. Yang Jr. and three grandchildren: Madison Yang, Carmen Yang, and Dorothy Yang. In 2001, while serving as president of the National Sports Training Center at Kaohsiung, Yang was diagnosed with liver cancer. He died on January 27, 2007, from a massive stroke. He is buried at Ivy Lawn Memorial Park in Ventura, California.

See also
Men's pole vault indoor world record progression
Decathlon world record progression

References

External links

 The Games of the XVII Olympiad, Rome 1960: Official Report of the Organizing Committee, The Organizing Committee of the Games of the XVII Olympiad, 1960.
 Volume 1, Yang's entry and vital statistics in the List of Athletes, p. 832
 Volume 2 Part 1, results and nine photographs of Yang during and after the decathlon competition, pp. 160–178
 Database Olympics
 UCLA notice about C.K. Yang's death 
  Asian Iron Man: Yang Chuan-kuang dies of illness, Apple Daily, January 29, 2007 
 

1933 births
2007 deaths
Amis people
Athletes (track and field) at the 1956 Summer Olympics
Athletes (track and field) at the 1960 Summer Olympics
Athletes (track and field) at the 1964 Summer Olympics
Taiwanese decathletes
Taiwanese male pole vaulters
Olympic athletes of Taiwan
Olympic silver medalists for Taiwan
University of California, Los Angeles alumni
People from Taitung County
Burials at Ivy Lawn Cemetery
Asian Games medalists in athletics (track and field)
UCLA Bruins men's track and field athletes
Athletes (track and field) at the 1954 Asian Games
Athletes (track and field) at the 1958 Asian Games
Medalists at the 1960 Summer Olympics
Asian Games gold medalists for Chinese Taipei
Asian Games silver medalists for Chinese Taipei
Asian Games bronze medalists for Chinese Taipei
Olympic silver medalists in athletics (track and field)
Medalists at the 1954 Asian Games
Medalists at the 1958 Asian Games
Converts to pagan religions from Christianity
Track & Field News Athlete of the Year winners
Taiwanese sportsperson-politicians
Aboriginal Members of the Legislative Yuan
Kuomintang Members of the Legislative Yuan in Taiwan
Taiwanese Taoists